Ross Glacier is a glacier 6 miles (10 km) long, flowing east from the juncture of Allardyce and Salvesen Ranges to Little Moltke Harbour, Royal Bay, on the north coast of South Georgia. First mapped by the German group of the International Polar Year Investigations, 1882–83, and named for Sir James Clark Ross.

See also
 List of glaciers in the Antarctic
 Glaciology

References

Glaciers of South Georgia